The Retinoic Acid-Inducible orphan G-protein-coupled receptors (RAIG) are a group of four closely related G protein-coupled receptors whose expression is induced by retinoic acid.

The exact function of these proteins has not been determined but they may provide a mechanism by which retinoic acid can influence G protein signal transduction cascades.  In addition, RAIG receptors interact with members of the frizzled class of G protein-coupled receptors and appear to activate the Wnt signaling pathway.

References

External links

G protein-coupled receptors